Switzerland's seven busiest airports by passenger traffic are Zurich Airport, Geneva Airport, Basel Airport, Bern Airport, St Gallen Airport, Lugano Airport and Sion Airport.  Only Zurich, Geneva and Basel exceed one million passengers per annum.

The following lists give passenger numbers, with an indication of the annual change in numbers, for the years from 2010 to date.

In graph

2019

2018

2017

2016

2015

2014

2013

2012

2011

2010

References

Switzerland
Busy
Airports, Busy
Switzerland
Airports, busiest

it:Aeroporti più trafficati in Europa
tr:Yolcu trafiğine göre Avrupa'nın en kalabalık havalimanları listesi